Burkhead is a surname. Notable people with the surname include:

Lisa Cano Burkhead (born 1970/1971), American politician and educator
Mike Burkhead, American football player
Rex Burkhead (born 1990), American football player